Yasue (written: ,  or  in hiragana) is a feminine Japanese given name. Notable people with the name include:

, Japanese politician
, Japanese swimmer
Yasue Maetake (born 1973), American sculptor
, Japanese model and actress

Yasue is also a Japanese surname. Notable people with the surname include:

, Imperial Japanese Army officer
, Japanese swimmer

See also
8101 Yasue, a main-belt asteroid

Japanese feminine given names
Japanese-language surnames